The National Environmental Standards and Regulations Enforcement Agency (also known as NESREA) is an environmental agency of the Federal Government of Nigeria that was established by law in 2007 to "ensure a cleaner and healthier environment for Nigerians". The agency functions as a parastatal enterprise of the Federal Ministry of Environment, and it is headed by a director general, who is also the chief executive officer of about 483 companies in the NESREA corporate family. Human activities that have negative effects on the environment are covered by NESREA's 33 National Environmental Regulations. The agency's authority includes process and equipment monitoring, compliance with set standards, disciplining violators of set rules, conducting public investigations, and submission of proposals to the minister for review in order to maintain environmental quality.

NESREA has recorded several achievements in the area of environmental compliance, monitoring, and enforcement since its establishment, including the enactment of several regulations pertaining to environmental protection, monitoring of environmental compliance, and enforcement actions.

The act establishing NESREA was amended in 2018  to accommodate changes in the conditions of appointment of council members, stiffer penalties for defaulters, and other related matters.

History 
 led by President Ibrahim Badamosi Babangida, to promulgate Decree 58 of 1988, establishing the Federal Environmental Protection Agency (FEPA) as the country's environmental watchdog.

The functions of FEPA were folded into the structures of the Federal Ministry of Environment, which is the policy-making body for environmental matters in Nigeria. However, it became apparent that there was a need for tighter regulation to address the country's environmental challenges,including desertification, rapid deforestation, coastal and gully erosion, poor environmental sanitation, air pollution and electronic waste. Furthermore, the global movement towards sustainable development in the aftermath of the Millennium Summit and the World Summit on Sustainable Development, and Nigeria's leadership in regional developmental programmes such as the New Partnership for Africa's Development (NEPAD), enhanced environmental awareness among the country's decision-makers.

NESREA was established in 2007 by the National Environmental Standards and Regulations Enforcement Agency Act (No. 20 of 2007). The act charges the agency with responsibility for protecting and developing the environment in Nigeria. Passed by the National Assembly of Nigeria and signed by President Umaru Musa Yar'Adua, the law gave the new agency jurisdiction over:

Structure 
NESREA is divided into five directorates: the Directorate of Administration and Finance, the Directorate of Legal Services, the Directorate of Planning and Policy Analysis, the Directorate of Inspection and Enforcement and the Directorate of Legal Services. Each director reports to the director general, who is also the chief executive officer. Public health specialist Ngeri Benebo was director general until 2015, when she was succeeded by Lawrence Anukam, a former director of the agency. Aliyu Jauro was appointed as the director general in 2019 by President Muhammadu Buhari.

Activities

Environmental impact assessment 
The functions of FEPA were taken up by the Federal Ministry of Environment when that agency was incorporated into its structure. The ministry inherited jurisdiction over environmental impact assessments (EIAs) and only the Minister of Environment was empowered to issue an environmental impact statement (EIS). Since the creation of NESREA, the agency has held the responsibility for enforcing EIAs in Nigeria. Though Nigeria runs a federal system of government, the sub-national regions (known as States) are not empowered to issue this document. NESREA's sole jurisdiction over certifying EIAs was affirmed in a 2015 court of appeals ruling.

Illegal wildlife trade 
Nigeria is a signatory to the Convention on International Trade in Endangered Species of Wild Fauna and Flora (CITES) , and NESREA is responsible for seizures and prosecution of illegal wildlife trade crimes in Nigeria. The agency has recorded a number of seizures of species and animal parts that were being transhipped through its ports, and it has prosecuted some prominent cases, including non-nationals, some of whom were sentenced to serve prison terms. A lion cub was rescued from two wildlife traffickers by NESREA in February 2022. The lion cub had been up for sale in the black market for 6 million naira before it was rescued by NESREA in conjunction with the Nigeria Police Force and the Nigeria National Park Service. An agency representative warned citizens to desist from environmental crimes as agencies continue to war against perpetrators.

The agency also works to curb the illegal trade of plants and plant products, like iroko tree and mahogany.

Waste disposal 

NESREA has policies on waste disposal, including the National Policy on Waste Battery Management and the National Environmental (Battery Control) Regulations. The policies make the environment more sustainable for people to inhabit.

NESREA (alongside other government agencies) discovered shiploads of obsolete and used electrical and electronic equipment that were about to be dumped within the country, turning them back to their ports of origin. Nigeria is currently witnessing a boom in the use of technological equipment leading to the massive production of electronic waste in urban centers. As a result, NESREA began to work in this sector to establish the application of the extended producer responsibility principle in waste management (other sectors of the economy such as the food and beverage industry are also involved). To achieve this, they set up a nationwide program and published guidelines for the relevant industry players.

In July 2009, NESREA hosted the International Conference on E-Waste, otherwise known as the Abuja Platform, which was focused on addressing the problem on a wider scale.

Public information
The agency commissioned a weekly TV and radio series,NESREA Watch, which had a cast that included popular Nigerian artists like Kiki Omeili.

Notable cases

Calabar superhighway project 
The Cross River State government began work in 2015 on a  superhighway from Calabar to Katsina-Ala. However, the road was to run through one of the country's pristine rainforests. This led to an uproar from local and international environmental activists who complained that the government had not solicited input before embarking on the project. NESREA learned that an EIA had not been carried out then issued an order for construction work to stop; NESREA then took the state government to court in order to stop them from continuing work until they had satisfied regulatory requirements.

Partnership with police 
NESREA embarked on a strategic partnership with the Nigeria Police Force starting in 2013, with the police set to support NESREA's enforcement activities NESREA's Environmental Health Officers complained that the agency ought to further empower their positions rather than allow the police to take over their statutory role.

Conflict over telecommunications sector 
In 2012, NESREA, in response to a public complaint, closed down a base station belonging to one of the telecoms operators in the country. This led to a split between them and the Nigerian Communications Commission (NCC), who argued that NESREA had no jurisdiction to regulate the telecommunications sector in the country. NESREA argued for the application of the precautionary principle when companies erect telecoms infrastructure, demanding that base stations be sited at least 10 metres away from inhabited areas, in line with Nigerian environmental regulations, further than the 5 metres approved by the NCC's regulations. Ultimately, the two agencies worked out their differences and agreed to work together.

2018 amendment 

The National Environmental Standards and Regulations Enforcement Agency Act was amended by the members of the National Assembly and signed by President Muhammadu Buhari in 2018. Since the amendment, the agency administereds stringent penalties and fines for environmental offenses such as poaching or illegal trafficking of wildlife, including endangered species.

References

External links 
 National Environmental Standards & Regulations Enforcement Agency (NESREA)

2007 establishments in Nigeria
Government agencies established in 2007
Government agencies of Nigeria